Jos Wildlife Park, known as one of the Plateau State's topmost tourist attractions and a place in Nigeria where nature has been conserved. The sights and sounds of nature and wildlife unfold in the park, located in the middle belt of Nigeria along the Jos-Miango road, about 5 kilometres from the city of Jos, and covering an area of 8 square kilometres. It is one of the biggest natural/artificial zoological garden and park in Nigeria.

The park is playing a major part in the development, promotion of tourism and ecotourism in Nigeria.

History 
In 1972, the Jos wildlife park was established by the governor, Joseph Gomwalk.

Wildlife 
The park is an habitat for various animals, mammals, birds, reptiles included.
Herbivores: elephants, cattle, elands, gazelles and others can be found at the park 
Carnivores: the park has several lions, crocodiles, hyenas, pythons and other carnivores
Birds: ostriches, the crowned crane, vultures are among the flight animals the park is proud too have 

In 2020, Mr. Zendi Mukuk an animal lover donated a pregnant African rock python to the park.

References 

Wildlife parks
Protected areas of Nigeria
Tourist attractions in Nigeria
1972 establishments in Nigeria
Zoos established in 1972